The SPC file format is a file format for storing spectroscopic data.

The SPC file format is a file format in which all kinds of spectroscopic data, including among others infrared spectra, Raman spectra and UV/VIS spectra. The format can be regarded as a database with records of variable length and each record stores a different kind of data (instrumental information, information on one spectrum of a dataset, the spectrum itself or extra logs). It was invented by Galactic Industries as generic file format for its programs. Their original specification was implemented in 1986, but a more versatile format was created in 1996.

Galactic Industries was purchased by Thermo Fisher Scientific who now maintain and develop the GRAMS Software Suite for which the format was defined. They provide free tools and libraries to allow developers to create and maintain SPC files consistently.

This file format is not in plaintext, such as XML or CSV, but is a binary format and is therefore not readable with a standard text editor but requires a special reader or software to interpret the file data. The Environmental Protection Agency publishes a free spectra reader called ShowSPC that is open to the public for reading spectra data. Additionally, a company AnalyzeIQ produces a free SPC to CSV converter aptly titled SPC2CSV, an open-source project OpenSpectralWorks is an alternative free reader, as well as SpectraGryph which has analytic and display capabilities for reading SPC files. The Essential FTIR software offers a file reader that can read, display, analyze and export .spc files as well as many other spectroscopy file formats.

References

External links
 Python module to read and convert SPC files on GitHub
 hyperSpec R (programming language) package on GitHub

Computer file formats
Spectroscopy